The height of existing lighthouses is expressed in two measures: the height of the tower itself, and the distance from the focal plane (that is, the center) of the light source to the water. The latter can be much greater than the former if the light stands on a promontory.

These are not listed because they were not constructed as lighthouses per se.

Tallest Lighthouses

Highest focal plane

 462 feet (141 m) - Old Point Loma lighthouse, California
 422 feet (129 m) - Cape Mendocino Light, California
 420 feet (128 m) - Makapuu Point Light, Hawaii
 395 feet (120 m) - Navassa Island Light, Navassa Island
 358 feet (109 m) - Farallon Island Light, California
 294 feet (90 m) - Point Reyes Light, California
 278 feet (76 m) - Marcus Hook Range Rear Light, Delaware
 277 feet (84 m) - Anacapa Island Light, California
 273 feet (83 m) - Point Sur Light, California
 258 feet (79 m) - Block Island Southeast Light, Rhode Island (since its move to higher ground)
 235 feet (71 m) - Cape Hinchinbrook Light, Alaska
 214 feet (65 m) - Alcatraz Island Light, California
 213 feet (65 m) - Molaka'i Light, Hawaii
 196 feet (60 m) - Trinidad Head Light, California
 192 feet (59 m) - Cape Hatteras Light, North Carolina   
 191 feet (58 m) - Pensacola Lighthouse, Florida
 185 feet (56 m) - Point Vicente Light, California
 183 feet (56 m) - Highland (Cape Cod) Light, Massachusetts
 180 feet (55 m) - Cape Charles Light, Cape Charles, Virginia
 180 feet (55 m) - Fire Island Light, New York
 180 feet (55 m) - Seguin Light, Maine
 178 feet (54 m) - Monhegan Island Light, Maine
 176 feet (54 m) - Table Bluff Light, California
 170 feet (52 m) - Cape Sarichef Light, Alaska
 169 feet (51 m) - Oak Island Light, North Carolina
 168 feet (51 m) - Montauk Point Light, New York
 166 feet (51 m)  - Cape Ann Light, Massachusetts
 165 feet (50 m) - Barnegat Light, New Jersey
 163 feet (50 m) - Charleston Light, South Carolina
 161 feet (49 m) - St. Augustine Light, Florida
 159 feet (48 m) - Ponce de Leon Inlet Light, Florida
 155 feet (47 m) - Point Arena Light, California
 154 feet (43 m) - Assateague Light, Virginia
 151 feet (46 m) - Dry Tortugas Light, Florida
 148 feet (45 m) - Pigeon Point Light, California
 146 feet (45 m) - Jupiter Inlet Light, Florida
 144 feet (44 m) - St. George Reef Light, California
 142 feet (43 m) - Piedras Blancas Light, California
 140 feet (43 m) - Point Bonita Light, California
 137 feet (42 m) - Boon Island Light, Maine
 137 feet (42 m) - Cape Canaveral, Florida
 134 feet (41 m) - Dice Head Light, Maine
 130 feet (40 m) - Rock of Ages Light, Michigan
 125 feet (38 m) - White Shoal Light, Michigan
 125 feet (38 m) - Mobile Point Light, Alabama
 123 feet (38 m) - Petit Manan Light, Maine
 120 feet (37 m) - Sand Key Light, Florida
 119 feet (36 m) - Grosse Point Light, Illinois
 116 feet (35 m) - San Luis Obispo Light, California
 111 feet (34 m) - Wind Point Light, Wisconsin
 110 feet (34 m) - Fort Point Light, California
 110 feet (30 m) - Bald Head Light, North Carolina
 113 feet (34 m) - Rawley Point Light, Wisconsin
 106 feet (32 m) - Eagle Island Light, Maine
 105 feet (35 m) - Cape Spencer Light, Alaska
 105 feet (32 m) - Baker Island Light, Maine
 102 feet (31 m) - Sanibel Island Light, Florida
 101 feet (31 m) - St. Croix River Light, Maine
 101 feet (22 m) - Portland Head Light, Maine
 100 feet (30 m) - Point Fermin Light, California
 100 feet (30 m) - Owls Head Light, Maine
 100 feet (30 m) - Key West Light, Florida
 96 feet (29 m) - Cape Decision Light, Alaska
 95 feet (29 m) - Yerba Buena Island, California
 92 feet (28 m) - Heron Neck Light, Maine
 91 feet (28 m) - Libby Island Light, Maine
 91 feet (28 m) - Eldred Rock Light, Alaska
 90 feet (27 m) - Old Cape Henry Light, Virginia
 89 feet (27 m) - Point Pinos Light, California
 88 feet (27 m) - Point Loma Light (new), California
 86 feet (26 m) - Tree Point Light, Alaska
 86 feet (26 m) - Sentinel Island Light, Alaska
 85 feet (26 m) - Cape St. Elias Light, Alaska
 84 feet (26 m) - Point Cabrillo Light, California
 81 feet (25 m) - Five Finger Islands Light, Alaska
 77 feet (23 m) - Battery Island Light, California
 76 feet (23 m) - Mary Island Light, Alaska
 75 feet (23 m) - Whitehead Light, Maine
 75 feet (23 m) - Punta Gorda Light, California
 75 feet (23 m) - Mount Desert Light, Maine
 75 feet (23 m) - Cedar Key Light, Florida
 75 feet (23 m) - Burnt Coat Harbor Light, Maine
 73 feet (22 m) - Los Angeles Harbor Light, California
 72 feet (22 m) - Moose Peak Light, Maine
 70 feet (21 m) - Point Montara Light, California
 67 feet (20 m) - Great Duck Island Light, Maine
 67 feet (20 m) - Race Point Light, Massachusetts
 65 feet (20 m) - Two Bush Island Light, Maine
 64 feet (20 m) - Egg Rock Light, Maine
 63 feet (19 m) - Point Retreat Light, Alaska
 61 feet (19 m) - East Brother Island Light, California
 59 feet (18 m) - The Cuckolds Light, Maine
 57 feet (17 m) - Franklin Island Light, Maine
 56 feet (17 m) - Little River Light, Maine
 56 feet (17 m) - Carquinez Strait Light, California
 54 feet (16 m) - Saddleback Ledge Light, Maine
 54 feet (16 m) - Mobile Middle Bay Light, Alabama
 53 feet (16 m) - Lubec Channel Light, Maine
 52 feet (16 m) - Southampton Shoal Light, California
 52 feet (16 m) - Pond Island Light, Maine
 52 feet (16 m) - Point Hueneme Light, California
 52 feet (16 m) - Deer Island Thorofare Light, Maine
 52 feet (16 m) - Curtis Island Light, Maine
 45 feet (14 m) - Wood End Light, Massachusetts
 43 feet (13 m) - Hendricks Head Light, Maine
 42 feet (13 m) - Prospect Harbor Point Light, Maine
 41 feet (13 m) - Perkins Island Light, Maine
 39 feet (12 m) - Grindel Point Light, Maine
 39 feet (12 m) - Browns Head Light, Maine
 37 feet (11 m) - Crabtree Ledge Light, Maine
 36 feet (11 m) - Long Point Light, Massachusetts
 36 feet (11 m) - Ram Island Light, Maine
 33 feet (10 m) - Lime Point Light, California
 33 feet (10 m) - Doubling Point Rear Range Light, Maine
 33 feet (10 m) - Bear Island Light, Maine
 25 feet (8 m) - Squirrel Point Light, Maine
 25 feet (8 m) - Blue Hill Bay Light, Maine
 23 feet (7 m) - Guard Island Light, Alaska
 23 feet (7 m) - Doubling Point Light, Maine

External links
 List of lighthouses and interactive map for entire U.S.A.
 
 Lighthouse Friends
 US-Lighthouses

References

Tallest
United States Coast Guard
Lighthouses